Nachal Telem (Hebrew: נחל תלם) is a wadi located in the West Bank begins in the western part of the Judaean Mountains and goes westwards. The official Israeli name of the wadi is "Nachal Natziv" (נחל נציב) but this name is not used in practice. 

The wadi contains the El Kof Nature Reserve (שמורת יער אל קוף) and the Tor-Safa Cave (מערת טור-צפא) which is the largest of the caves in the western slopes of the Judea mountain.

The El Kof Nature Reserve was planted in 1927 during the British mandate by the Department of Government plantings, originally on an area of 1,000 dunams. In 1966 the Forestry Department of the Jordanian government expanded the forest as it extended it with additional 900 dunams.

On December 28, 2007 a terrorist attack was carried out in Nahal Telem in which two Jewish tourists were killed.

References

Rivers of the West Bank